The 2006 Bristol City Council election took place on 4 May 2006, on the same day as other local elections. The Labour Party continued to lose seats, but the Liberal Democrats failed to gain enough to form an overall majority. This election saw the first election of a Green Councillor to Bristol City Council – the first time four parties had been represented since the Council’s creation.

Ward results

Avonmouth

Bedminster

Bishopston

Bishopsworth

Brislington East

Brislingon West

Filwood

Hartcliffe

Henbury

Hengrove

Henleaze

Horfield

Kingsweston

Knowle

Lockleaze

Redland

Southmead

Southville

Stockwood

Stoke Bishop

Westbury-on-Trym

Whitchurch Park

Windmill Hill

References

2006 English local elections
2006
2000s in Bristol